Villongo is a comune (municipality) in the Province of Bergamo in the Italian region of Lombardy, located about  northeast of Milan and about  east of Bergamo.

The municipality of Villongo contains two frazioni (subdivisions, mainly villages and hamlets): Sant'Alessandro and San Filastro.

Villongo borders the following municipalities: Adrara San Martino, Credaro, Foresto Sparso, Paratico, Sarnico, Zandobbio.

Demographic evolution

Infrastructure and accessibility 
Between 1901 and 1921 the town hosted one stop of the Bergamo-Trescore-Sarnico tramway.

Twin towns – sister cities
Villongo is twinned with:

  Seloncourt, France

References